= Chengdu Grain Storage Research Institute =

Grain storage research facility

Chengdu Grain Storage Research Institute (CGSRI) is a grain storage research and development and quality inspection facility in Chengdu, China. It is administered by the State Grain Administration, a department of the National Development and Reform Commission. CGSRI has served as project leader on over 230 national-level key projects. CGSRI has also carried out academic exchanges and technological cooperation in grain storage and quality inspection with experts and institutions in many countries. The information center of CGSRI is also the official body of the Storage Professional Branch of the CCOA.
